Mediala spectaculoides is a moth of the family Erebidae first described by Michael Fibiger in 2008. It is known from Sri Lanka.

The wingspan is about 14 mm. The hindwing is greyish brown, darker towards termen. The terminal line is brown and the fringes are basally beige. There is an indistinct discal spot. The underside of the forewing and upper part of hindwing are brown, other parts of the hindwing are grey. There is a discal spot and a postmedial line on the hindwing.

References

Micronoctuini
Moths described in 2008